Gilbert may refer to:

People and fictional characters
Gilbert (given name), including a list of people and fictional characters
Gilbert (surname), including a list of people

Places

Australia
 Gilbert River (Queensland)
 Gilbert River (South Australia)

Kiribati
 Gilbert Islands, a chain of atolls and islands in the Pacific Ocean

United States
 Gilbert, Arizona, a town
 Gilbert, Arkansas, a town
 Gilbert, Florida, the airport of  Winterhaven
 Gilbert, Iowa, a city
 Gilbert, Louisiana, a village
 Gilbert, Michigan, and unincorporated community
 Gilbert, Minnesota, a city
 Gilbert, Nevada, ghost town
 Gilbert, Ohio, an unincorporated community
 Gilbert, Pennsylvania, an unincorporated community
 Gilbert, South Carolina, a town
 Gilbert, West Virginia, a town
 Gilbert, Wisconsin, an unincorporated community
 Mount Gilbert (disambiguation), various mountains
 Gilbert River (Oregon)

Outer space
 Gilbert (lunar crater)
 Gilbert (Martian crater)

Arts and entertainment
 Gilbert Collection, an art collection in the Victoria and Albert Museum
 Gilbert (band), a name used by English composer and musician Matthew Gilbert Linley
 Gilbert (film), a documentary on Gilbert Gottfried

Education
 Gilbert Academy, a defunct private preparatory school for African Americans in Louisiana
 Gilbert School, a privately endowed secondary school that serves as the public high school for Winchester, Connecticut

Ships
 , a survey ship of the United States Coast and Geodetic Survey
 , a fisheries research ship of the United States Fish and Wildlife Service and (as NOAAS Charles H. Gilbert) the National Oceanic and Atmospheric Administration

Other uses
 A. C. Gilbert Company, an American toy company
 Gilbert (unit), a CGS unit of magnetomotive force
 Gilbert Building (disambiguation), several buildings on the American National Register of Historic Places
 Gilbert Cell, a transistor circuit used in communication electronics
 Gilbert Hill, a monolith column of black basalt rock in Andheri, India
 Gilbert House (disambiguation), various buildings
 Gilbert Model, a social class model
 Gilbert Rugby, an English sporting-goods manufacturer
 Gilbert Street, Adelaide, Australia
 Gilbert's syndrome, a benign medical condition that may cause mild jaundice
 Gilbert (typeface), a typeface created in honor of artist Gilbert Baker
 Hurricane Gilbert, a 1988 Caribbean hurricane

See also
Gilberts (disambiguation)
Fitzgilbert, including a list of people with the name
Gilberto, a similar name